Anders Moen (1 October 1887 – 5 July 1966) was a Norwegian gymnast who competed in the 1908 Summer Olympics. As a member of the Norwegian team, he won the silver medal in the gymnastics team event in 1908.

References

1887 births
1966 deaths
Norwegian male artistic gymnasts
Gymnasts at the 1908 Summer Olympics
Olympic gymnasts of Norway
Olympic silver medalists for Norway
Olympic medalists in gymnastics
Medalists at the 1908 Summer Olympics
20th-century Norwegian people